Barisal Polytechnic Institute or BPI is a Government Technical Institute in Barisal, Bangladesh.  It is one of the largest polytechnic Institutes in Bangladesh. The polytechnic has crossed 58 years of its foundation opening its door for the students with a solemn promise to spread quality of technical education and research on 1962. Situated at the main campus of the institute is very close to Barisal city.

Directorates 
The institute operates under the executive control of the Ministry of Education(MOE), acting through the Directorate of Technical Education (DTE). The academic programmes are regulated by the Bangladesh Technical Education Board (BTEB).

Departments 

 Computer Technology
 Electrical Technology
 Electronics Technology
 Civil Technology
 Power Technology
 Mechanical Technology
 Electro-Medical Technology

References

External links 
  Official website
diplomabd.com - Barisal Polytechnic Institute 31-12-22

Colleges in Barisal District
Education in Barisal
Educational institutions established in 1962
Polytechnic institutes in Bangladesh
1962 establishments in East Pakistan